Kherson Oblast Football Federation is a football governing body in the region of Kherson Oblast, Ukraine. The federation is a member of the Regional Council of FFU and the collective member of the FFU itself.

Previous Champions

1947    Skadovsk
1948    FC Avanhard Kherson
1949    
1950    FC Spartak Kherson
1951    
1952    FC Spartak Henichesk
1953    FC Spartak Kherson (2)
1954    FC Spartak Kherson (3)
1955    FC Avanhard Kherson (2)
1956    FC Avanhard Kherson (3)
1957    FC Avanhard Kherson (4)
1958    FC Avanhard Kherson (5)
1959    FC Avanhard Henichesk
1960    FC Enerhiya Nova Kakhovka
1961    FC Enerhiya Nova Kakhovka (2)
1962    FC Enerhiya Nova Kakhovka (3)
1963    FC Lokomotyv Kherson
1964    FC Enerhiya Nova Kakhovka (4)
1965    FC Lokomotyv Kherson (2)
1966    FC Enerhiya Nova Kakhovka (5)
1967    FC Naftovyk Kherson
1968    FC Budivelnyk Henichesk
1969    FC Budivelnyk Henichesk (2)
1970    FC Tekstylnyk Kherson
1971    FC Enerhiya Nova Kakhovka (6)
1972    FC Spartak Kherson (4)
1973    FC Enerhiya Nova Kakhovka (7)
1974    FC Enerhiya Nova Kakhovka (8)
1975    FC Krystal Kherson
1976    FC Enerhiya Nova Kakhovka (9)
1977    FC Enerhiya Nova Kakhovka (10)
1978    FC Kolos Novomykolayivka
1979    FC Kolos Skadovsk
1980    FC Enerhiya Nova Kakhovka (11)
1981    FC Enerhiya Nova Kakhovka (12)
1982    FC Kolos Osokorivka
1983    FC Kolos Osokorivka (2)
1984    FC Kolos Osokorivka (3)
1985    FC Kolos Osokorivka (4)
1986    FC Enerhiya Nova Kakhovka (13)
1987    FC Enerhiya Nova Kakhovka (14)
1988    FC Meliorator Kakhovka
1989    FC Meliorator Kakhovka (2)
1990    FC Tavria Novotroitske
1991    FC Meliorator Kakhovka (3)
1992    FC Tavria Novotroitske (2)
1993    FC Tavria Novotroitske (3)
1994    FC Tavria Novotroitske (4)
1995    FC Kolos Osokorivka (5)
1996    FC Tavria Novotroitske (5)
1997    FC Myr Hornostayivka
1998    FC Dynamo Tsyurupinsk
1999    FC Dynamo Tsyurupinsk (2)
2000    FC KZESO Kakhovka (4)
2001    FC KZESO Kakhovka (5)
2002    FC KZESO Kakhovka (6)
2003    FC KZESO Kakhovka (7)
2003    FC Dynamo Tsyurupinsk (3)
2004    FC Enerhiya Nova Kakhovka (15)
2005    FC Myr Hornostayivka (2)
2006    FC Myr Hornostayivka (3)
2007    FC Myr Hornostayivka (4)
2008    FC Syhma Kherson
2009    FC Enerhiya Nova Kakhovka (16)
2010    FC Krystal Kherson (2)
2011    FC Tavria Novotroitske (6)
2012    FC Temp Mykilske
2013    FC Tavria Novotroitske (7)
2014    FC Viktoriya Bekhtery
2015    FC Kolos Khlibodarivka
2016    FC Kolos Khlibodarivka (2)
2017    FC Druzhba Novomykolaivka
2018    SC Kakhovka (8)
2019    FC Tavria Novotroitske (8)

Top winners
 16 - FC Enerhiya Nova Kakhovka
 8 - FC KZESO (Meliorator) Kakhovka
 8 - FC Tavria Novotroitske
 5 - FC Avanhard Kherson
 5 - FC Kolos Osokorivka
 4 - FC Spartak Kherson
 4 - FC Myr Hornostayivka
 3 - FC Dynamo Tsyurupinsk
 2 - 4 clubs (Kolos Khl., Krystal, Budivelnyk, Lokomotyv)
 1 - 11 clubs

Professional clubs
 FC Spartak Kherson, 1946-1949, 1958-1960
 FC Krystal Kherson (Mayak, Stroitel, Lokomotiv, Vodnyk, Tavria), 1961-2006, 2011-2017, 2018-2021
 FC Enerhiya Nova Kakhovka, 1967-1970, 2010-2021
 FC Kakhovka (Meliorator), 1992-1996
 FC Tavria Novotroitske, 1994-1995
 FC Myr Hornostayivka, 2011-2014, 2015-2019
 (SC Tavria Simferopol out of Beryslav), 2017-2021

See also
 FFU Council of Regions

References

External links
 Kherson Oblast Football Federation (old site)
 Kherson Oblast Football Federation

Football in the regions of Ukraine
Football governing bodies in Ukraine
Sport in Kherson Oblast